The Mandanr, Mandar, or Mandan are a Pashtun tribe, branch of Yusufzai. They are the children of Mand, who was the son of Umar baba. Umar Baba was the brother of Yousaf, Umar left the tribe and moved from Kandahar to Hassanabdal. An Arab Quraysh family in Hassanabdal gave their daughter to Omar in marriage. Omar had a son from an Arab girl which they named Mandanr. When Mandanr was one year old, Omar Baba died. Upon hearing the news of his death, Yusuf left Kandahar and went to Hassan Abdal. He took his sister-in-law to Kandahar. According to the Pakhtun tradition, he married the widow of Umar Baba and gave Mandanr his daughter in marriage. That is why Yusufzai and Mandanr are considered one tribe, they are thus a sub tribe of Yousafzai. Mandanr had four sons.Mano, Razar, Khizar and Mehmood.

In Pakistan the people of this tribe live mostly in Mardan, Lower Dir, Swat, Swabi, Buner and Charsadda. The Mandanrs were a warrior tribe who revolted throughout the Mughals tenure in Afghanistan and India and are famous for leading the Pashtun rebellions during this time.

Demographics 
Chamla has been historically the locale of the Mandanr tribe. Mandanr are the largest group in the Swabi, Dir , Buner, and Mardan Districts, with a considerable number in Swat. Buner District is to the north, Swabi District to the south, Dir District  and Mardan District is to the west. Manezai Mandanrs arrived in Swat after a land dispute between brothers. The youngest brother, Babujan Afghan was exiled from Koga, Chamla, Buner after a dispute on who the next Khan would be. This group belonging to the Razarr group were the founders of modern Mingora city in Swat. They were settled there by Saidu Baba. The population is distributed as follows:
Swabi: 1.6 million
Mardan : 1.5 million
 Dir  : 0.5 million
Buner : 0.2 million
Swat : 0.1 million
Karachi: 0.3 million
Other cities (international): 0.3 million
Total: 3.6 million

The Mandanr are organized into subdivisions. Mardan is inhabited largely by two sub-tribes of the Mandanr, the Kamalzai and Amazai. Kamalzais are further divided into two main branches: Masharanzai, near the towns of Toru and Kashranzai, and chiefly in the town of Mardan and Manizai in Swat. Some of the Khels(Branches of Kasharanzai) include Skander Khel(Rawanikhel)(taji khel), Degan Khel, Sadi Khel, BaraKhan Khel, Bahdar Khel, Bat Khel, BAMO KHEL, Mahmood Khel, Bhai Khel (also called Bay Khel) Mohammad Khel, Sheri Khel and Rustam Khel. Amazais are divided into two main branches, the Doulatzai and Ismialzai. The Razar occupy Swabi and the tehsil Razar. They're further divided into the Khizarzai, Mahmood or Mamuzai, Manuzai and Razzar.

Traditional sport 
In the past, archery was used in warfare, but with the advent of modern warfare, archery has been relegated to the game of ‘Mukha’. The slingshot, called ‘Leenda’ in the local dialect, is also used in Mukha, and is made from the horns of the Markhor– a wild goat found in the forests and forested mountains. The horn of a single Markhor is enough to make just one slingshot.

Notable people 

 Karnal Sher Khan
 Shaheen Sardar Ali
 Ameer Haider Khan Hoti
 Azam Khan Hoti
 Kalu Khan
 Najib ad-Dawlah
 Gaju Khan
 Junaid Khan (cricketer)
 Nigar Johar

References

Yusufzai Pashtun tribes